The Canon EOS 77D, known in Japan as the EOS 9000D, and in Mainland China as the EOS 770D, is a digital single-lens reflex camera announced by Canon on February 14, 2017. It has a body-only MSRP of US$899.99, which is more expensive than Canon EOS 760D, which it replaces. The camera can be purchased as a body-only, as kit with the 18-55mm IS STM lens at US$1,049, with the new 18-135mm IS USM lens at US$1,499.

According to Canon's U.S. subsidiary, the camera "represents a new category of advanced amateur EOS cameras, a step above the Rebel series." However, at least one reviewer considered the 77D to be a part of the Rebel line for all practical purposes. The camera features excellent core specs and its sensor is the same as the one in the Canon 80D. The biggest differences between the 80D and 77D are that the 77D has a Digic 7 engine, Movie Electronic IS (electronic stabilisation for movies) and bluetooth, the 80D has better weather sealing, pentaprism viewfinder and has Focus Microadjustment (AFMA). The 77D includes a similar but not identical layout to the EOS 80D. It has the same twin control dials, dedicated AF-ON button and top-plate LCD as in the 80D.

The 77D is geared toward the semi-pro crowd. Canon does not offer a battery grip for this model, although some aftermarket grips are available, with the shutter button working via an external cable.

Main features
New features over the EOS 750D are:
 New 24.2-megapixel CMOS sensor with Dual Pixel CMOS AF, instead of Hybrid CMOS AF III.
 Canon released the Dual Pixel CMOS AF version in EOS 77D, EOS 80D, EOS 200D, EOS 800D, and also M6 it is the world's fastest AF focusing speed of 0.03 second.
 45 cross-type AF points, compared to 19.
 DIGIC 7, standard ISO 100–25600, H:51200 (DIGIC 6, ISO 100–12800, H:25600 on the 760D)
 High-speed Continuous Shooting at up to 6.0 fps
 Built-in NFC, and Bluetooth.
 1080p at 60/50 fps video recording capability
 Movie Electronic IS (electronic stabilisation for movies)
 Built-in HDR and time-lapse recording capability
 Inherited AF-ON button from mid-line and pro-line.
 15 Custom Functions with 44 settings settable with the camera
 By default, the 77D uses Canon's standard UI, but it can be switched to the more beginner-friendly graphic UI also found in the new T7i if desired
 Compatible with Bluetooth remote BR-E1

Gallery

References

External links

 EOS 77D
 EOS 77D vs T6s
 New Canon EOS 77D sits between Rebel T7i and EOS 80D
 Canon EOS 77D

Cameras introduced in 2017
Live-preview digital cameras
Canon EOS DSLR cameras